This is a list of places in Idaho.

List of places in Idaho: A-K
List of places in Idaho: L-Z

Lists of places in Idaho